Peter Smith (born 11 July 1942, in Hanworth, England) is a retired international motorcycle speedway rider who spent his entire career with the Poole Pirates.

Career
Smith began riding speedway motorcycles at the training track at Rye House Stadium in the early 1960s. In 1962, Smith took part in a number of second-half meetings at Poole and made his first full appearance for Poole at a challenge match at Rye House. He continued to improve at Poole and by 1968, Smith had become the Pirates third heat-leader. Poole won the British League championship in 1969 and Smith rose to the number one position at the club with an average of 9.52. Smith also made his first international appearances for England in 1969 against Australia, New Zealand and Scotland. He was made Poole's captain in 1971 and continued to ride for the club until his retirement from the sport in 1977.

He made 620 appearances for Poole Pirates during his 15 years career establishing a club record.

References

1942 births
Living people
British speedway riders
English motorcycle racers
Poole Pirates riders